De Haar was a village in the Netherlands and part of the Coevorden municipality in Drenthe. In the 1940, De Haar and Dalerveen merged into a single village.

References 

Coevorden
Former populated places in the Netherlands